Pahna (also Romanized as Pahnā) is a village in Zayandeh Rud-e Jonubi Rural District, Ben County, Chaharmahal and Bakhtiari Province, Iran. At the 2006 census, its population was 324, in 80 families. The village is populated by Turkic people.

References 

Populated places in Ben County